Juan Jairo Galeano Restrepo (born 12 August 1962) is a Colombian former footballer who played as a striker.

Career
Born in Andes, Galeano played for Atlético Nacional, Millonarios, Envigado, Independiente Medellín and Deportivo Pereira.

He made 11 international appearances (scoring once) for Colombia, between 1987 and 1989.

References

1962 births
Living people
Colombian footballers
Colombia international footballers
Atlético Nacional footballers
Millonarios F.C. players
Envigado F.C. players
Independiente Medellín footballers
Deportivo Pereira footballers
Association football forwards
Sportspeople from Antioquia Department